Alfonso "Tito" Auger Vega (born 3 March 1968, in Vega Alta, Puerto Rico) is a Puerto Rican musician best known for being the lead singer of the Rock en Español band Fiel a la Vega. Auger is also the band's main songwriter, together with Ricky Laureano.

Biography

Early years and schooling
Auger was born in Hato Rey, Puerto Rico, and grew up in the town of Vega Alta. He is the son of Alfonso Auger Cabrera and Olga Vega Colón. Auger studied in the Nuestra Señora del Rosario school in Vega Baja. He followed his studies at the Universidad del Sagrado Corazón in San Juan where he received a bachelor's degree in Communications in 1990. As a young man, he migrated to New Jersey in the hope of becoming a rock star.

Interest in music
Auger started in music when he was 15 years old, playing the guitar. When he was 18, he was invited by some childhood friends (Emilio and Jorge Arraiza among them) to play in a band called Crossroads. The band performed mostly in the local area of Vega Alta and Vega Baja playing mostly cover songs of popular American artists of the time like Bryan Adams, REO Speedwagon, and others.

At that time, he also started writing. His first song was in English and was titled "Neverending Wait". Shortly after, Auger met guitarist Ricky Laureano. Together they formed another band called Farenheitt. The band recorded a single with the first writing collaborations of Auger and Laureano. Their first songs were titled "Maryann" and "I'd Been Looking".  His music and style have been termed latin rock and urban trova.

With Fiel a la Vega

After returning to Puerto Rico, Auger and Laureano reunited with friends Jorge and Pedro Arraiza, with whom they had played before and formed Fiel a la Vega. The band quickly achieved great success in the island releasing several radio hits and winning several awards. As of 2007, the band has released four studio albums. In 2001, Auger and Laureano took time away from their band to create "Cancion para Vieques" (Song to Vieques), to protest the United States occupation of the Puerto Rican island of Vieques.

Other collaborations
Aside of the band, Auger has contributed to other artists both performing and writing songs. Recently, he collaborated with popular Puerto Rican folk singer, Roy Brown, and American folk musician Tao Rodríguez-Seeger (from The Mammals), in an album called Que Vaya Bien. The group toured the island together promoting a song called "El Banquete de los Sánchez" written by Brown, and based on a poem by Luis Rafael Sánchez. Brown is one of Fiel a la Vega's main influences and they had performed together previously. Brown's most famous song, "Boricua en la Luna", has been covered by the band and is a staple in the band's live set.

See also

 Music in Puerto Rico
 Puerto Rican rock

References

External links
Fiel a la Vega Official site

1968 births
Living people
Puerto Rican guitarists
Fiel a la Vega members
People from Vega Alta, Puerto Rico
20th-century American guitarists
21st-century American guitarists
Universidad del Sagrado Corazón alumni